Gondeshlu or Gondashlu, also rendered as Gundashlu, may refer to:
 Gondeshlu-ye Bala
 Gondeshlu-ye Pain